Dmytro Rostyslavovych Ledviy (born 26 August 2003) is a Ukrainian professional footballer who plays as a goalkeeper for Rukh Lviv.

Career
Born in Lviv, Ledviy is a product of the local Karpaty Lviv academy (his first coaches were Volodymyr Shcherba and Hennadiy Pohorilets).

After spending eight seasons in the Karpaty Lviv youth team and playing in the Ukrainian Premier League Reserves, he signed a contract with the Ukrainian Premier League side Rukh Lviv in September 2020. He made his debut in a home draw against Mynai on 14 November 2022.

References

External links
 
 

2003 births
Living people
Sportspeople from Lviv
Ukrainian footballers
Ukraine youth international footballers
Association football goalkeepers
FC Rukh Lviv players
Ukrainian Premier League players